Live at XMU is a 2008 EP by The Most Serene Republic.

Track listing
"Compliance" -
"Anhoi Polloi" -
"Sherry and Her Butterfly" -
Present of Future End" -

References

The Most Serene Republic albums
2008 EPs
Arts & Crafts (record label) live albums
Live EPs
Arts & Crafts Productions EPs
2008 live albums